Curse Your Branches is the first full-length album by David Bazan, the front-man of the indie rock band Pedro the Lion. It was released on September 1, 2009, on Barsuk Records. It is rated 82/100 by critics on Metacritic, earning it the distinction of "universal acclaim".

The album was recorded from early 2008 to mid-2009 by David Bazan in his basement studio near Seattle, Washington. Additional recording, mixing, and mastering was done by long-time collaborator and former Pedro the Lion member T. W. Walsh at his studio in Massachusetts.

The album debuted at #1 on the Billboard Heatseekers chart and #116 on the Billboard 200 the week of its release.

The same day as this album was released, Bazan also put out a single covering Bob Dylan's "The Man in Me" backed with Leonard Cohen's "Hallelujah".

Track listing 
All songs written by David Bazan, except where otherwise noted
 "Hard to Be" – 6:23
 "Bless This Mess" – 3:57
 "Please Baby, Please" – 3:49
 "Curse Your Branches" – 3:34
 "Harmless Sparks" – 2:30
 "When We Fell" – 3:40
 "Lost My Shape" – 3:44
 "Bearing Witness" – 3:13
 "Heavy Breath" – 3:19
 "In Stitches" – 4:33

iTunes Store bonus tracks
 "The Man in Me" (Bob Dylan) – 2:55

Personnel 
 David Bazan – vocals, guitar, drums, synthesizer, bass guitar, piano, engineering, production

Additional musicians
 David H. Bazan – piano
 Andy Fitts – vocals
 Casey Foubert – pedal steel guitar
 Yukki Matthews – bass guitar, electric guitar
 James McAlister – percussion
 Josh Ottum – lead guitar
 John Roderick – vocals, guitar
 J. Tillman – vocals
 T. W. Walsh – bass guitar, mixing, mastering, engineering
 Blake Wescott – vocals

Other personnel
 Bob Andrews – photography
 Christian Helms and Renee Fernandez (The Decoder Ring) – cover art

References 

2009 albums
David Bazan albums
Barsuk Records albums